The 2013 Meistriliiga (also known as A. Le Coq Premium Liiga for sponsorship reasons) was the 23rd season of the Meistriliiga, the first level in the Estonian football system. The season began on 2 March 2013 and ended on 9 November 2013. Nõmme Kalju, the defending champions,  finished runners-up behind Levadia, who won their 8th title.

Teams
2012 Esiliiga champions Infonet, who lost out to Kuressaare in the promotion/relegation play-off as Esiliiga Runners-up in 2011, were promoted to this season's Meistriliiga making their first appearance in the top division. Esiliiga runners-up Tarvas lost out on promotion as Meistriliiga's 9th placed club Tallinna Kalev defeated them 3–1 on aggregate in the Promotion/relegation play-off.

Tammeka finished at the bottom of the 2012 season but escaped relegation due to dissolving of seventh place Viljandi.

Stadiums and locations

Personnel and kits
Note: Flags indicate national team as has been defined under FIFA eligibility rules. Players and Managers may hold more than one non-FIFA nationality.

Managerial changes

Player transfers
 Transfers made during the 2012–13 winter transfer window:

 Transfers made during the 2013 summer transfer window:

League table

Relegation play-offs
Tammeka as 9th-placed team faced 2013 Esiliiga side Rakvere Tarvas in a two-legged play-off for the spot in next year's competition.

Tammeka won 6–2 on aggregate and retained their Meistriliiga spot for the 2014 season.

Results
Each team plays every opponent four times, twice at home and twice away, for a total of 36 games.

First half of season

Second half of season

Season statistics

Top scorers

Hat-tricks

 4 Player scored 4 goals.

Awards

See also
 2013 Esiliiga
 2013 Esiliiga B
 2012–13 Estonian Cup
 2013–14 Estonian Cup

References

Meistriliiga seasons
1
Estonia
Estonia